Honami 'Amy' Furuhara  (born in Kawakami, Nagano), known professionally as Aaamyyy (stylized as AAAMYYY) is a Japanese electronic musician. Originally a member of electronic pop groups Go Retro and Eimie, Furuhara began working with the psychedelic rock band Tempalay from 2015 (becoming an official member in 2018), and starting a solo career in 2017.

Biography 

Amy Furuhara grew up in a rural community in Nagano Prefecture. She first became interested in music when she joined the light music club in high school, where she primarily played the drums. Furuhara was inspired by musicians such as M.I.A. and T-Pain who she heard after traveling to Canada as an exchange student in 2008, and by final year of high school she had begun composing songs. Following high school, Furuhara attended the Kanda University of International Studies, where she spent up to 14 hours per day speaking English, and later a flight attendant school for Air Canada in Vancouver. She returned to Japan as Air Canada required at least three years of work experience, and worked as an English conversation teacher in Osaka.

Furuhara started creating music when she was 22 when she returned to Japan. Inspired by the music she heard in Canada and having some experience using GarageBand, she decided to start a Tokyo-based electropop band called Go Retro with her friend Shiori Ogawa in 2013. Her bandmate Ogawa played the drums and used a Kaoss Pad for their live performances, while Furuhara performed on the synthesizer. Furuhara decided to start singing as the band's vocalist, so that she could lessen the work that Ogawa needed to do. The band released two demos and performed concerts around the Tokyo, Kyoto and Osaka areas, and received a development contract from a record label, where Furuhara was given vocal training lessons. After a year together, the band broke up, as Ogawa decided to return home to Osaka.

Shortly after Go Retro's dissolution in 2014, Furuhara was approached by a DJ called Takuma, and together they formed the group Eemie, producing exclusively English-language music. Initially self-releasing electro/chillwave music on Bandcamp, the group debuted on independent label Maxtreme Records in 2015 with the single "Carnival", and were listed among AP Japan's 36 Bands You Need To Know 2015. Eemie performed at the Summer Sonic summer rock festival in 2015. In 2015, Furuhara met the psychedelic pop/rock group Tempalay, and was invited to perform as a live support member of their band. Furuhara toured the US, performing both as a part of Tempalay and as a member of Eemie in March 2016 (including a performance at South by Southwest). In August 2016 the band disbanded, performing a final concert on August 31, where the band also released their debut and final album.

Solo career, Tempalay 

Furuhara began her solo career in February 2017 as Aaamyyy, after becoming a radio DJ on InterFM's programme Tokyo Scene, where she debuted her song "8PM". For her solo career, she decided to sing in Japanese, as a way to reach listeners more easily in Japan. Aaamyyy released her debut extended play Weekend EP in September on cassette, recording the entire release on her phone, using the iOS app Figure. This was followed by the Maborosi EP in February 2018, as well as a compilation release of this plus her debut EP, entitled Maborosi Weekend, which was her first widely distributed release in Japan.

In June, Furuhara officially became a member of Tempalay, which lead to the band releasing the extended play Nante Subarashiki Sekai in September, featuring Furuhara as the band's synthesizer player, and as their occasional background vocalist. Aaamyyy's final of her three EP series, the Etcetra EP, was released digitally and on cassette in October.

Aaamyyy began recording her debut album Body in October 2018, releasing it in February 2019. A concept album set in 2615, the release was inspired by Netflix television shows such as Black Mirror and Maniac (2018). The album featured collaborations with American musician Computer Magic, New York-based group JIL and Japanese group Paellas' vocalist Matton. Tempalay's third album With Love from the 21 Century was released in June, and was the band's most commercially successful work to date, reaching #30 on Oricon's weekly charts.

In March 2020, Aaamyyy collaborated with musician Shin Sakiura for the song "Night Running", which was used as the ending theme song for the Netflix anime series BNA: Brand New Animal.

In July 2022, Aaamyyy released her fourth EP digitally, entitled ECHO CHAMBER.

Personal life

Furuhara adopted the English name Amy while living in Canada.

Discography

Studio albums

Extended plays

Compilation albums

Singles

As lead artist

As featured artist

Promotional singles

Guest appearances

Songwriting credits

References

External links 

Official website
Official Space Shower label site

21st-century Japanese singers
21st-century Japanese women singers
English-language singers from Japan
Living people
Japanese electronic musicians
Japanese women singer-songwriters
Japanese singer-songwriters
Japanese women pop singers
Musicians from Nagano Prefecture
Synth-pop singers
Japanese women in electronic music
Year of birth missing (living people)